Al-Iskan Bank Building is a  tall commercial building containing offices belonging to the Housing Bank for Trade and Finance located in Amman, Jordan. It is considered to be a popular landmark in Amman.

References

See also
List of tallest buildings in Amman

Buildings and structures in Amman
Tourist attractions in Amman
Office buildings completed in 1982
1982 establishments in Jordan
Tallest